Satya Paul Agarwal is an Indian neurosurgeon, academician, and public health administrator. He is the incumbent Secretary General of the Indian Red Cross Society. The Government of India honoured him in 2010, with the Padma Bhushan, the third highest civilian award, for his services to the fields of medicine and public health.

Agarwal has been active during several disaster relief operation such as epidemic control activities and the tsunami of 2004 for which he was awarded the Henry Dunant Medal. He has also written several books and articles. He is the spokesperson for the Red Cross and Red Crescent Statutory Meetings on Health and access to safe water and improved sanitation He has delivered several lectures and keynote addresses in seminars and conferences

Positions

 Secretary General of the Indian Red Cross Society – 2005 onwards
 Chair of the IFRC Advisory Body on Sustainable Development and Health – International Federation of Red Cross and Red Crescent
 Director General of Health Services, Government of India – 1996 to 2005
 President – Tuberculosis Association of India (TAI)

Awards and recognitions
 Padma Bhushan – 2010
 DSc – Punjab University – 2007
 Life Time Achievement Award for TB – 2005
 Dr. B. C. Roy National Award for the Eminent Medical Person – 2002
 Henry Dunant Medal – International Red Cross and Red Crescent Movement
 Belgian Redcross Flanders Gold Medal, 2014 – Belgian Redcross Flanders

Writings

External links
 Meeting with Ban Ki Moon, UN Secretary General
 Reference on Rate MDs
 Times of India news
 ND TV news
 Padma Awards report
 Reference on Pearson General Knowledge Manual – 2011

References

Living people
Recipients of the Padma Bhushan in medicine
20th-century Indian medical doctors
Medical doctors from Punjab, India
Dr. B. C. Roy Award winners
Indian neurosurgeons
Year of birth missing (living people)
20th-century surgeons